The following article presents a summary of the 1959 football (soccer) season in Brazil, which was the 58th season of competitive football in the country.

Taça Brasil

Semifinals

Final

Bahia declared as the Taça Brasil champions by aggregate score of 5-5.

Torneio Rio-São Paulo

Final Standings

Santos declared as the Torneio Rio-São Paulo champions.

State championship champions

Other competition champions

Brazil national team
The following table lists all the games played by the Brazil national football team in official competitions and friendly matches during 1959.

References

 Brazilian competitions at RSSSF
 1959 Brazil national team matches at RSSSF

 
Seasons in Brazilian football
Brazil